For information on all La Salle University sports, see La Salle Explorers

The La Salle Explorers men's soccer team is a varsity intercollegiate athletic team of La Salle University in Philadelphia, Pennsylvania, United States. The team is a member of the Atlantic 10 Conference, which is part of the National Collegiate Athletic Association's Division I. La Salle's first men's soccer team was fielded in 1949. The team plays its home games at McCarthy Stadium. The Explorers are coached by Pat Farrell.

Seasons

NCAA tournament results 

La Salle has appeared in one NCAA tournament.

References

External links 
 

 
Soccer clubs in Philadelphia
1949 establishments in Pennsylvania
Association football clubs established in 1949